Steve Divnick is an inventor and businessman. His patented inventions include the "Spiral Wishing Well" (1985) seen at various museums across the United States, and a smaller version for individuals. He has developed a boat lift, the DivnickLift, for docking small vessels onto larger boats. His company Divnick International Group also invented, patented and manufactures an adjustable-loft telescopic golf club and a range of other golf clubs.

Spiral wishing well
This is a waterless product which allows people launch coins on a spiral path onto the smooth fiberglass surface of the vortex funnel. The coins spin faster and faster as they cling to the nearly vertical throat of the funnel in a blur of speed before they drop into the locked base. The coin revenue is kept as a donation by the organisation who owns the well. It therefore has similar functionality to a traditional wishing well without the size and water. In 1987, Popular Science reported the typical take was $5–$25 per day, with one Salvation Army branch reporting a peak of $532 in one day.

According to documentation on the Spiral Wishing Well website, the first Well they sold was in 1985 to the United States Air Force Base in Dayton, Ohio where it has had over $2 million tossed into it. Many locations passed the $100,000 amount. The first one-day record was $532 at a Kmart store, another at a small school that raised $7,352, and a church that raised $40,979.

The first Well that Divnick made was as an offering device for the children in his church. He began to see the potential as a non-profit fund raising device in public locations, and the company has shipped thousands of Wells all over the world where they have raised in excess of $200 million for charity. 100% of the revenue stays with the charity. Divnick and his company never receives any portion of the coins tossed into the Wells.

Many of the waterless wishing wells are sponsored by individuals or companies. Since they are placed in retail and other foot-traffic locations, they provide significant positive community relations for the sponsors.

The Wells are also popular with science teachers who use the company's Student Guide to teach topics such as tornadoes, whirlpools, planetary orbits, and the physics of a vortex.

References

External links
Divnick International website

20th-century American inventors
Living people
Year of birth missing (living people)